John Pedersen or Pederson may refer to:

 John Pedersen (arms designer), arms designer who worked for Remington
 John Pederson (politician) (born 1968), American politician and member of the Minnesota State Senate
 John Pedersen (wrestler) (born 1948), Danish Olympic wrestler
 John Hugo Pedersen, Norwegian Olympic fencer
 John Pederson (coach), American football, skiing, and swimming coach